All Blessed  is the seventh studio album by dance music act Faithless. It was released on 23 October 2020. It is their first studio album in 10 years, succeeding 2010's The Dance. It is also their first album which doesn't feature lead vocalist Maxi Jazz.

Background
On 5 June 2020, the band released two edits of a new song, "Let the Music Decide", which featured the vocals of George the Poet and was only available for a limited time on music streaming platforms.

On 16 July 2020, Faithless released follow up single, "This Feeling". Similar to "Let The Music Decide", this track also features a spoken poet known as Suli Breaks, with additional vocals by singer-songwriter Nathan Ball.

Another single with Nathan Ball on vocals, "Synthesizer", was released on 28 August 2020 alongside its music video, with an announcement for the release date of 23 October for the band's seventh album "All Blessed". The tracklist however does not feature the previous two singles "Let the Music Decide" and "This Feeling", making "Synthesizer" the album's first official single.

The album's second single "Innadadance" was released 20 October, three days before the album's release. It features Suli Breaks and Jazzie B.

Former vocalist Maxi Jazz is thanked in the album's sleeve notes for "passing the baton".

Track listing

Personnel
Faithless
 Sister Bliss – production
 Rollo Armstrong – additional production, keyboards

Additional musicians
 Suli Breaks – guest vocals on tracks 1, 2, 4, 11, 12
 Nathan Ball – guest vocals on tracks 3, 5
 Caleb Femi – guest vocals on track 3
 LSK – guest vocals on track 4
 Gaika – guest vocals on track 6
 Jazzie B – guest vocals on track 11
 Damien Jurado – guest vocals on track 12

Charts

References

2020 albums
Faithless albums